Tollerton is an English village and civil parish in the Rushcliffe district of Nottinghamshire, just south-east of Nottingham. The population of the built-up area in 2011 was 1,544. It was estimated to have risen to 1,655 in 2019.

Governance
Tollerton has a parish council and is represented on Rushcliffe Borough Council. The Member of Parliament (MP) for Rushcliffe since December 2019 is the Conservative Ruth Edwards.

Tollerton Hall
St Hugh's College was founded in 1948 at Tollerton Hall by the Roman Catholic Diocese of Nottingham as its junior seminary, accepting boys from aged 11 upwards, but by 1969 it had opened its doors to secular students. It closed in 1986, leaving the hall as a corporate HQ until June 2017, when it was bought by a businessman, Ian Kershaw, for use as a private home again.

Event and amenities
There is an annual village fayre held in June. This gathers residents around craft stalls, entertainments, refreshments and small exhibitions. The money generated helps local charities.

The pub named the Air Hostess recalls Nottingham Airport at Tollerton. It is unusual in having a piste for playing pétanque. It used to have a large carved sign depicting an air hostess. However, in 2011, the then owners of the premises, Everards Brewery, decided to refurbish them and in doing so replaced the original sign with a conventional hanging sign depicting an air hostess. This changed to a hanging sign depicting Tollerton Hall, an aircraft and fields. A scheme was put in operation to save the pub from closure by introducing local ownership. This led to the establishment of a community trust, in which shares were issued, and the pub freehold was purchased. It reopened with a new tenant landlord in July 2020.

Tollerton has two churches. St Peter's Anglican Church dates from the end of the 12th century. Developments in 1909 resulted in the church as it is today. There is a Methodist church located in a modern building in the village centre.

The few shops include a post office, a petrol station & mini Waitrose and a restaurant serving oriental-style food, The Charde. The village centre is host to a hairdressers, a pet shop and a pet salon. The Parish Rooms at the end of the parade of shops in Burnside Grove serve as a centre for local community activities and meetings. Regular pop up shops visit the village including fish and chips and a fish monger.

Outdoor amenities include a park with an multi-use games area for five-a-side football, basketball and tennis and a full-sized grass main football pitch. 

The park was refurbished with new children's play equipment in April 2008 and again more recently through the active Tollerton project. This added the first interactive play equipment in Rushcliffe, the largest single piece of adventure play equipment produced for a UK park by manufacturer Produlic and a community gym.

Education
Tollerton Primary School takes children of 5–11 years of age. It is a member of Equals Trust Multi Academy Trust, based in nearby Keyworth.

Tollerton Playgroup, next to the primary in Burnside Grove, caters for children under five. The nearest secondary school is South Wolds Academy and Sixth Form (specialist language school) in Keyworth.

Economy
Tollerton is a dormitory village, with most earners commuting into Nottingham for work, although some agricultural employment remains, along with local businesses in car sales. Just outside the village, at Nottingham Airport, there is a large private hospital and a computer furniture maker.

Transport
The nearest railway station is Nottingham, five miles to the north-west. Tollerton is served by two bus stops in Melton Road for "The Keyworth" Trent Barton service between Keyworth and Nottingham city centre. At peak times it runs every 15 minutes.

The village lies on Melton Road (A606), adjacent to Wheatcroft Roundabout, where the A52 and the A606 meet. This provides good links from the village to Nottingham, the M1 motorway, and surrounding places such as Melton Mowbray and Leicester.

Freedom of the Parish
The following people and military units have received the Freedom of the Parish of Tollerton.

Individuals
 Councillor  Julian Smith : January 2022.

Gallery

References

External links

Tollerton online
Air Hostess Public House

Villages in Nottinghamshire
Rushcliffe